Diospyros lanceifolia is a tree in the family Ebenaceae. The specific epithet lanceifolia means "lance-shaped leaves".

Description
Its twigs are reddish brown when young, aging blackish or dark brown. Inflorescences bear up to 10 flowers.

Distribution and habitat
Diospyros lanceifolia is native to Nepal, India, Thailand, Sumatra, Peninsular Malaysia, Borneo and the Philippines. Its habitat is lowland forests.

References

lanceifolia
Flora of tropical Asia
Plants described in 1832